The American Athletic Conference men's soccer tournament is the conference championship tournament in soccer for the American Athletic Conference (the American).  The tournament has been held every year since the split from the Big East Conference in 2013.  It is a single-elimination tournament and seeding is based on regular season records. The winner, declared conference champion, receives the conference's automatic bid to the NCAA Division I men's soccer championship.

Format
Since the creation of the AAC in 2013, the tournament was structured as follows. The teams are seeded based on the order of finish in the conference's round robin regular season.  Tiebreakers begin with the result of the head-to-head matchup.  The teams are then placed in a single-elimination bracket, with the top seed playing the lowest seed, until meeting in a final championship game.  After two overtime period, ties are broken by shootout rounds, with the winner of the shootout advancing.

Opening round games are held at campus sites with the higher seed hosting, while the semifinals and final are held at a predetermined campus location, specifically the home field of The American's regular-season champion.

For the 2016 and 2017 seasons the tournament was reduced to just the top 4 teams in the conference. Since 2018 the tournament was expanded to the top 6 teams.

Champions

By year

By school
This table of championship statistics is updated after each event.

 Teams in italics no longer sponsor men's soccer in The American.
 Charlotte, FIU, Florida Atlantic, and UAB are playing their first American Conference seasons in 2022.

References

External links